Medulin is a municipality in the southern part of the Istrian peninsula in Croatia. At the 2011 census the municipality had a population of 6,481, while the settlement proper had 2,777 inhabitants.

Medulin is built around a harbour between Cape Promontore and Capo Merlera. The town centre is to the northeast of the harbour and includes the main square and the twin-spired St Agnes Church.

Medulin's economy is based on tourism. During the months of July and August, its population increases to over 10,000 due to an influx of tourists that come to visit Medulin, famous for its camping sites and coastline.

Demographics
The municipality consists of 7 settlements:

Medulin population (1857 - 2011)

References

Populated coastal places in Croatia
Populated places in Istria County
Municipalities of Croatia